Ugo Humbert defeated Andrey Rublev in the final 6–3, 7–6(7–4), to win the singles tennis title at the 2021 Halle Open. Humbert's win earned him his third career ATP Tour singles title and his first ATP 500 victory, and also made him the first French player to win the tournament since Henri Leconte won the inaugural edition in 1993. Both Humbert and Rublev were contesting their first career final on grass.

Roger Federer was the defending champion from when the event was last held in 2019, but he lost in the second round to Félix Auger-Aliassime.

Seeds

Draw

Finals

Top half

Bottom half

Qualifying

Seeds

Qualifiers

Lucky loser
  Yannick Hanfmann

Qualifying draw

First qualifier

Second qualifier

Third qualifier

Fourth qualifier

Fifth qualifier

Sixth qualifier

References

External links
 Main draw
 Qualifying draw

Singles